St Mary's Cathedral, Elphin, is a former cathedral in Ireland. 

It was formerly the cathedral of the Diocese of Elphin, and then a joint cathedral in Kilmore, Elphin and Ardagh. It was founded by St. Patrick and destroyed during the  Rebellion of 1641. It was rebuilt during the time of Bishop John Parker. It has lain ruined since 1957.

Notes

 
Anglican cathedrals in the Republic of Ireland
Religion in County Roscommon
Elphin